The Feriköy Cemetery is a burial ground situated in Feriköy quarter of Şişli district on the European part of Istanbul, Turkey. It is administered by the Metropolitan Municipality. Many prominent figures from the world of politics, sports and arts rest here.

Notable burials
Listed in alphabetical order of surnames:
 Ahmet Ağaoğlu (1869–1939), Azerbaijani and Turkish publicist and journalist,
 Çetin Alp (1947–2004), pop music singer,
 Kadri Aytaç (1931–2003), football player and manager,
 Mihri Belli (1915–2011), leader of the socialist movement in Turkey,
 Ahmet Berman (1932–1980), footballer,
 Eylül Cansın (1992–2015), transgender woman,
 Keriman Halis Ece (1913–2012), beauty pageant titleholder, pianist, and fashion model,
 Berkin Elvan (1999–2014), a boy, who was killed by police with a tear-gas can during the June 2013 anti-government protests in Turkey,
 Feridun Buğeker (1933–2014), footballer,
 Sami Frashëri (1850–1904), Albanian writer, philosopher, playwright,
 Erol Günaydın (1933–2012), theater and film actor,
 Oya Kayacık (1938–2020), Turkish philanthropist, orphanage woman nurse,
 Ahmet Mete Işıkara (1941–2013), geophysicist and earthquake scientist,
 Coşkun Kırca (1927–2005),  diplomat, journalist and politician,
 Zafer Önen (1921–2013), film actor,
 Turgut Özatay (1927–2002), film actor,
 Süleyman Seba (1926–2014), football player and president of the football club Beşiktaş J.K.,
 Fatma Aliye Topuz (1862–1936), novelist, columnist, essayist, women's rights activist and humanitarian,
 Ali Sami Yen (1886–1951), sports official, founder of the football club Galatasaray,
 Khalil bey Khasmammadov, (1873–1947) Azerbaijani politician and diplomat.

Latin quarter
 Leon Walerian Ostroróg (1867–1932), international jurist of Polish descent who died in London

See also
 Feriköy Protestant Cemetery

References

Cemeteries in Istanbul
Şişli
Sunni cemeteries